Cătălin is a Romanian first name (male) that may refer to:
Cătălin Anghel, footballer
Cătălin Burlacu, basketball player
Cătălin Cursaru, footballer
Cătălin Costache, canoer
Cătălin Crăciun, footballer
Cătălin Dedu, footballer
Cătălin Doman, footballer
Cătălin Fercu, rugby union player
Cătălin-Ionuț Gârd, tennis player
Cătălin Grigore, footballer
Cătălin Hîldan, footballer
Cătălin Lichioiu, footballer
Cătălin Măruță, television host
Cătălin Mitulescu, film director
Cătălin Moroșanu, kickboxer
Cătălin Mulțescu, footballer
Cătălin Munteanu, footballer
Cătălin Necula, footballer
Cătălin Nicolae, rugby union player
Cătălin Păun, footballer
Cătălin Predoiu, lawyer and Justice Minister
Cătălin Răcănel, footballer
Cătălin Straton, footballer
Cătălin Ștefănescu, footballer
Cătălin Tofan, footballer
Cătălin Țăranu, go player
Cătălin Voicu, member of parliament
Cătălin Vraciu, footballer

The feminine form is Cătălina:

Cătălina Cristea, tennis player
Cătălina Gheorghițoaia, fencer
Cătălina Ponor, gymnast

Romanian masculine given names